The knockout stage of 2013 Liga Indonesia Premier Division took place between September 8, 2013 and September 14, 2013 with the final at the Manahan Stadium in Surakarta, Central Java. The draw for the semi-finals took place on 2 September 2013 at the headquarters of the Football Association of Indonesia. To determine which teams who were to be promoted to the Indonesia Super League After the completion of the group stage on 30 August 2013, four teams qualified for the semi-finals (winner from each group and one best runner-up), which were played from 8 September 2013. The Champions, Runner-Up, and the 3rd Place finishers directly qualified to the 2014 Indonesia Super League with the 4th-place finisher qualified via Play-off with the 15th-place finisher of the 2013 Indonesia Super League.

Qualified teams

Bracket

Semi-finals

Persikabo  vs Persebaya DU (Bhayangkara)

Persik  vs Perseru

Third-placed

Final

Promotion/relegation play-off 

Note:
(O) = Play-off winner; (P) = Promoted to 2014 Indonesia Super League; (R) = Relegated to 2014 Liga Indonesia Premier Division.

References

Knockout stage